1965 Academy Awards may refer to:

 37th Academy Awards, the 1965 ceremony honoring the best in film for 1964
 38th Academy Awards, the 1966 ceremony honoring the best in film for 1965